David Howard Susskind (December 19, 1920 – February 22, 1987) was an American producer of TV, movies, and stage plays and also a TV talk show host. His talk shows were innovative in the genre and addressed timely, controversial topics beyond the scope of others of the day.

Early life, education and military service
Susskind was born to a Jewish family of modest means in Manhattan, and grew up in Brookline, Massachusetts.  He graduated from Brookline High School in 1938.  He attended the University of Wisconsin–Madison and then Harvard University, graduating with honors in 1942. He served in the Navy during World War II and, as communications officer on an attack transport, saw action at Iwo Jima and Okinawa.

Career
His first job after the war was as a press agent for Warner Brothers. Next he was a talent agent for Century Artists, ultimately ending up in the Music Corporation of America's newly minted television programming department, managing Dinah Shore, Jerry Lewis, and others. In New York, Susskind formed Talent Associates, representing creators of material rather than performers. Ultimately, Susskind produced movies, stage plays and television programs.

Talk shows
In 1954, Susskind became producer of the NBC legal drama Justice, based on case files of the Legal Aid Society of New York. His program Open End began in 1958 on New York City's commercial independent station WNTA-TV, channel 13, the predecessor to WNET, and was so titled because the program continued until Susskind or his guests were too tired to continue.

In 1961, Open End was constrained to two hours and went into national syndication. The show was retitled The David Susskind Show for its telecast on Sunday night, October 2, 1966. In the 1960s it was the first nationally broadcast television talk show to feature people speaking out against American involvement in the Vietnam War. In the 1970s it was the first nationally broadcast television talk show to feature people speaking out for gay rights. The show continued until its New York outlet cancelled it in 1986, approximately six months before Susskind died.

During his close to three decade run, Susskind covered many controversial topics of the day, such as race relations, transsexualism and the Vietnam War. His interview of Soviet Premier Nikita Khrushchev, which aired in October 1960, during the height of the Cold War, generated national attention. It is one of the very few talk show telecasts from the era that was preserved and can be viewed today.

In 1961, Susskind conducted a series of interviews with former President Harry Truman in Truman's hometown of Independence, Missouri. After picking Truman up at his home to take him to the Truman Presidential Library for the interviews over a number of days, Susskind asked Truman why he hadn't been invited into the home. According to presidential historian Michael Beschloss, Truman flatly told Susskind, "This is Bess's house" and that there had never been nor would there ever be a Jewish guest in it.

Joyce Davidson, with whom Susskind was in a relationship, began working as a co-producer of a television talk show Susskind hosted locally in New York called Hot Line in June 1964. It was a different show from the Open End talk show. Hot Line was the first television show to use the recently invented ten-second broadcast delay. This gave the control room time to delete material deemed unfit for broadcast, especially from telephone call-ins. Davidson had a hand in the on-air version of the show and among other duties screened viewer phone calls. She also made the first approach to some of the people who appeared as guests on Hot Line, including Malcolm X, whom she invited for Hot Line immediately after he gave a speech at The Town Hall.

In a now notorious interview with then 25-year-old Muhammad Ali during a recently-unearthed 1968 appearance on the British program The Eamonn Andrews Show, Susskind displayed an intense antipathy and vitriol towards the famous boxer, whom he excoriated with withering criticism for refusing to be conscripted into the U.S. military for the Vietnam War. Some commentators have described this as a racist attack.

Producer
Susskind was also a noted producer, with scores of movies, plays, and TV programs to his credit. His legacy is that of a producer of intelligent material at a time when TV had left its golden years behind and had firmly planted its feet in programming which had wide appeal, whether or not it was worth watching. Among other projects, he produced television adaptations of Beyond This Place (1957), The Bridge of San Luis Rey (1958), The Moon and Sixpence (1960), Ages of Man (1966), Death of a Salesman (also 1966), Look Homeward, Angel (1972), The Glass Menagerie (1973), and Caesar and Cleopatra (1976); the television films Truman at Potsdam (1976), Eleanor and Franklin (1976), and Eleanor and Franklin: The White House Years (1977); and the feature films A Raisin in the Sun (1961), Requiem for a Heavyweight  (1962), and Loving Couples (1980). In 1964, he produced Craig Stevens's acclaimed CBS drama Mr. Broadway, which left the air after thirteen episodes. He also produced and owned all the rights to the 1961 fourteen-episode macabre CBS TV series – Way Out. His production company, Talent Associates, also produced Get Smart.

Personal life
Susskind was married twice. Both of his marriages ended in divorce. In 1939, he married Phyllis Briskin; they had three children: Diana Susskind Laptook, Pamela Susskind Schaenen, and Andrew Susskind. They divorced in 1966. In the same year he married Joyce Davidson, who had two daughters from a prior marriage, Connie and Shelley. They had a daughter, Samantha Maria Susskind Mannion. They separated in 1982 and divorced in 1986.

Susskind was first cousin to television writer and producer Norman Lear.

Death
In 1987 at the age of 66, Susskind suffered a fatal heart attack in New York City, hours after Andy Warhol died, also in Manhattan. He was interred at Westchester Hills Cemetery in Hastings-on-Hudson, New York.

Legacy
In 1988, Susskind was inducted into the Television Hall of Fame.

Sources
Battaglio, Stephen. David Susskind A Televised Life. St. Martin's Press. New York 2010.

References

External links
 Museum of Broadcast Communications entry on David Susskind
 
David Susskind Papers at the Wisconsin Center for Film and Theater Research.
Speech by David Susskind given on February 15, 1970. Audio recording from The University of Alabama's Emphasis Symposium on Contemporary Issues

1920 births
1987 deaths
University of Wisconsin–Madison alumni
Harvard University alumni
American television talk show hosts
American film producers
American television producers
Jewish American military personnel
Burials at Westchester Hills Cemetery
20th-century American businesspeople
Brookline High School alumni
20th-century American Jews
United States Navy personnel of World War II